Sabrina Ouazani (born 6 December 1988) is a French actress of Algerian descent. She is best known internationally for her performance as Frida in Games of Love and Chance and as Charlotte Ben Smires in Netflix's hit rom-com series The Hook Up Plan.

Career
Joined by her mother in the casting of Games of Love and Chance, Sabrina Ouazani is retained by director Abdellatif Kechiche who shot this movie in the neighborhood of Franc-Moisin, a few hundred meters from his city of residence, Balzac apartment block 4000 in La Courneuve (a Paris suburb). For this first role, she was nominated for a César Award for Most Promising Actress in 2005.

Filmography

Theatre

External links 

 

French film actresses
1988 births
Living people
French people of Algerian descent
People from Saint-Denis, Seine-Saint-Denis
21st-century French actresses
Best Supporting Actress Jutra and Iris Award winners